Kirk Walker is an American softball coach, currently serving as associate head coach of the UCLA Bruins softball team. He previously served as the head coach for the Oregon State Beavers softball team, where he is the winningest softball coach in program history.

Coaching career
Walker began his coaching career as an undergraduate assistant coach for the UCLA Bruins in 1984. He spent 11 years at UCLA where the Bruins won six Women's College World Series championships in 1984, 1985, 1988, 1989, 1990 and 1992.

Prior to the 1995 season, Walker was named head coach for the Oregon State Beavers softball team. In 1999, he led the Beavers to a 47–25 record, setting a program-record for the most wins, and advanced to NCAA Tournament for the first time in program history. Following the season he was named Pac-10 Coach of the Year and Speedline Pacific Region Co-Coaching Staff of the Year. In 2005 he led the Beavers to a 43–16 record, and their first-ever conference championship in program history and an automatic berth to the NCAA Tournament. The Pac-10 championship was the first regular-season title for any women's sports program in Oregon State history. Following the season he was named Pac-10 Coach of the Year. On March 1, 2009, Walker earned his 500th career win in a victory against Minnesota.

Walker served as the head coach at Oregon State for eighteen years, where he posted a 594–490–3 record, and eight seasons with at least 40 wins. He is the all-time winningest softball coach in program history and the fifth-winningest in Oregon State history regardless of sport. On August 7, 2012, Walker resigned as head coach of the Beavers to return to UCLA as an assistant coach. On August 12, 2022, Walker was promoted to associate head coach for the Bruins.

On November 18, 2019, Walker was named head coach and assistant general manager for the California Commotion of National Pro Fastpitch. The team has yet to play a game as the 2020 and 2021 seasons were cancelled due to the COVID-19 pandemic.

Personal life
Walker came out as gay in 2005, announcing he and his partner, Randy Baltimore, adopted a daughter named Eva. He was the first openly gay male coach in NCAA Division I history.

Head coaching record

References

Living people
American softball coaches
LGBT people from California
Oregon State Beavers softball coaches
Softball coaches from California
UCLA Bruins softball coaches
People from Woodland Hills, Los Angeles
Sportspeople from Los Angeles
Year of birth missing (living people)